Bečvář is a lunar impact crater that is located near the equator on the far side of the Moon. It was named after Czechoslovakian astronomer Antonín Bečvář. It lies to the northeast of the crater Necho, within that feature's ray system. To the north-northeast is the crater Gregory.

This is a worn, eroded crater system with a few tiny craterlets lying across the floor and rim. A double-crater formation occupies the southwestern rim, with Bečvář Q forming the northwestern member of this pair. The crater Bečvář X is attached to the northern rim.

Bečvář lies at the center of an unnamed, highly subdued, 200-km-diameter crater which was originally discovered during the Apollo 16 mission and reported by Farouk El-Baz. The name Necho was proposed for the crater, but the name was eventually adopted for the small, bright-rayed crater along the south margin of the unnamed crater.

Satellite craters 

By convention these features are identified on lunar maps by placing the letter on the side of the crater midpoint that is closest to Bečvář.

References

External links

Bečvář at The Moon Wiki

Becvar